Lyginopteris is a genus of Late Carboniferous seed fern stems with a very distinctive outer cortex of sclereids forming a pattern in cross section like Roman numerals on a clock face, often called a Sparganum cortex. Some Lyginopteris were parasitized by water molds, such as the Combresomyces.

References

Pteridospermatophyta
Pennsylvanian plants
Prehistoric plant genera
Pennsylvanian first appearances
Pennsylvanian extinctions
Fossils of Georgia (U.S. state)